Wuxu may refer to the following towns in China:

 Wuxu, Anhui (吴圩镇), in Dingyuan County, Anhui
 Wuxu, Hechi (五圩镇), in Jinchengjiang District, Hechi, Guangxi
 Wuxu, Nanning (吴圩镇), in Jiangnan District, Nanning, Guangxi

See also
 Nanning Wuxu International Airport, located in Wuxu, Nanning
 Hundred Days' Reform or Wuxu Reform, a 1898 reform movement in Qing China